Amonicë oil field is an Albanian oil field that was discovered in 1980. It is situated near the village Amonicë, Sevaster municipal unit, Vlorë County. It is one of the biggest on-shore oil field of Albania. It began production in 1981 and produces oil.

See also

Oil fields of Albania

References

Oil fields of Albania